A treshchotka (singular; sometimes referred to in the plural, treshchotki) is a Russian folk music idiophone percussion instrument which is used to imitate hand clapping. It consists of a set of small boards on a string that are clapped together as a group.

Name
The word is derived from the root tresk-, meaning 'crackling' or 'rattle'. In Russian slang,  sometimes describes a person who is excessively chatty and loud.

History
There are no known documents confirming the use of the treshchotka in ancient Russia. However, in 1992, an archeological dig in the city of Novgorod found two wooden boards, which, by the hypothesis of Vladimir Ivanovich Povetkin, were parts of a 12th-century treshchotka.

The first published mention of the treshchotka was made by Kliment Vasilievich Kvitka. The  great Russian lexicographer Vladimir Dahl describes the treshchotka in his "Explanatory Dictionary of the Live Great Russian language" as a device made to produce crackling, thundering and racketing sounds. 

In modern times, some villages in Russia are still playing and crafting treshchotkas.

Construction 
The treshchotka is made of a set of 15 to 20 thin oak planks, which are about 16 to 18 centimeters (approximately 6-8 inches) long. The planks are tightly held by a rope that is threaded through a hole at the end of each board. To make sure that the boards are not pressed against each other, a small wooden spacer (2 cm [approximately 1.5 inches]) is inserted between each board.

Technique
To play a treshchotka, the player holds it by the ends with both hands, generally level with the chest or head, and vary the motion between brusque and smooth to produce crackling and clicking sounds.

Superstitions

The treshchotka was used during peasant wedding ceremonies where instruments could have been decorated with ribbons, flowers and sometimes jingle bells. This use of the treshchotka may have performed not only a musical role but also served some mystical function, perhaps protecting newlyweds from evil spirits.

References

External links
 Трещётки (Russian)

European percussion instruments
Idiophones
Russian culture
Handicrafts
Russian musical instruments
Russian inventions